Polish–Teutonic War may refer to:
Teutonic takeover of Danzig (Gdańsk) (1308–1309) 
Polish–Teutonic War (1326–1332) over Pomerelia, concluded by the Treaty of Kalisz (1343)
the Polish–Lithuanian–Teutonic War or Great War (1409–1411), ending the Lithuanian Crusade with the Peace of Thorn (1411)
the Hunger War (1414) over the border in Samogitia
the Gollub War (1422) over the border in Samogitia, ending with the Treaty of Melno
Polish–Teutonic War (1431–1435), part of the Lithuanian Civil War
Thirteen Years' War (1454–1466) or War of the Cities, a Polish-backed revolt of western Prussian cities against Teutonic rule
War of the Priests (Poland) (1467–1479), contesting the election of the Bishop of Warmia
Polish–Teutonic War (1519–1521), known as Reiterkrieg in German, over the Knights' status as a Polish vassal

See also

 
 
 
 

Wars involving Poland
Wars involving the Teutonic Order